Some mobile phones support use of two SIM cards, described as dual SIM operation. When a second SIM card is installed, the phone either allows users to switch between two separate mobile network services manually, has hardware support for keeping both connections in a "standby" state for automatic switching, or has individual transceivers for maintaining both network connections at once.

Dual SIM phones are mainstream in many countries where phones are normally sold unlocked. Dual SIMs are popular for separating personal and business calls, in locations where lower prices apply to calls between clients of the same provider, where a single network may lack comprehensive coverage, and for travel across national and regional borders. In countries where dual SIM phones are the norm, people who require only one SIM simply leave the second SIM slot empty. Dual SIM phones will usually have two unique IMEI numbers, one for each SIM slot.

Devices that use more than two SIM cards have also been developed and released, notably the LG A290 triple SIM phone, and even handsets that support four SIMs, such as the Cherry Mobile Quad Q70.

History
The first phone to include dual SIM functionality was the Benefon Twin, released by Benefon in 2000. It wasn't until the late 2000s, however, when more dual SIM phones entered the marketplace and started to attract mainstream attention, most of them coming from small Chinese firms producing phones using Mediatek systems-on-a-chip.

Such phones were initially eschewed by major manufacturers due to potential pressure from telecommunications companies, but in the early 2010s Nokia, Samsung, Sony and several others followed suit, with the Nokia C2-00, Nokia C1-00 and Nokia C2-03 and most notably the Nokia X, phones from Samsung's Duos series, and the Sony Xperia Z3 Dual, Sony Xperia C and tipo dual. Apple added dual SIM support in its 2018 iPhone XS models, with models sold in China containing two physical SIM slots, and models sold elsewhere supporting dual SIM by means of (Embedded) eSIM alongside a single physical SIM.

Types

Adapters
Prior to the introduction of dual SIM phones, adapters were made for phones to accommodate two SIMs, and to switch between them when required.

Passive
Dual SIM switch phones, such as the Nokia C1-00, are effectively a single SIM device as both SIMs share the same radio, and thus are only able to place or receive calls and messages on one SIM at the time. They do, however, have the added benefit of alternating between cards when necessary.

Standby
Dual standby phones, such as those running on Mediatek chipsets, allows both SIMs to be accessed through time multiplexing. When making or receiving calls, the modem locks to the active channel; the other channel would be ignored and thus unavailable during the duration of the call. Examples of Dual-SIM Standby smartphones include the Samsung Galaxy S Duos, the Sony Xperia M2 Dual, and the iPhone XS, XS Max and iPhone XR.

Active
Dual SIM active phones or dual active (DSDA) phones, however, come with two transceivers, and are capable of receiving calls on both SIM cards, at the cost of increased battery consumption. One example is the HTC Desire 600.

Unequal connectors

Some telephones distinguish a primary SIM slot that allows for 4G/3G connectivity and a secondary slot limited to 3G/2G connectivity. However, selecting either of the SIMs as primary is usually possible without physically swapping the SIMs.

Some phone models utilize a "hybrid" SIM tray, which allows two SIM cards or one SIM card and one MicroSD memory card. Huawei's Mate 20 range introduced a proprietary memory card format called Nano Memory, which exactly matches the dimensions of a nano SIM card.

Some devices accept dual SIMs of different form factors. The Xiaomi Redmi Note 4 has a hybrid dual SIM tray that accepts one micro SIM card and one nano SIM card, the latter of which can be swapped for a MicroSD card.

Market
Dual SIM phones have become popular especially with business users due to reduced costs by being able to use two different networks, with one possibly for personal use or based on signal strength or cost, without requiring several phones.

Availability
Some sub-contract Chinese companies supply inexpensive dual SIM handsets, mainly in Asian countries. The phones, which also usually include touch screen interfaces and other modern features, typically retail for a much lower price than branded models. While some such phones are sold under generic names or are rebadged by smaller companies under their own brand, numerous manufacturers, especially in China, produce phones, including  dual SIM models, under counterfeit trademarks such as those of Nokia or Samsung, either as cosmetically-identical clones of the originals, or in completely different designs, with the logo of a notable manufacturer present in order to take advantage of brand recognition or brand image.

Dual SIM phones are common in developing countries, especially in Southeast Asia and the Indian subcontinent, with local firms like Karbonn Mobiles, LYF, Micromax and Cherry Mobile releasing feature phones and smartphones incorporating multiple SIM slots.

The French Wiko Mobile is also an example of rebadged Chinese Dual-SIM phones sold in few European countries as well as in North-West Africa.

Usage
Dual SIM phones have been rare in countries where phones have been usually sold on contract, as the carriers selling those phones prevent SIMs from competing carriers from being used with the phones. However, dual SIMs have been popular in locations where people normally buy phones directly from manufacturers. In such places there is little lock-in to carrier networks, and the costs of having two phone numbers are much lower.

Dual SIM phones allow separate numbers for personal and business calls on the same handset. Access to multiple networks is useful for people living in places where a single network's coverage may prove inadequate or unreliable. They are also useful in places where lower prices apply to calls between clients of the same provider.

Dual SIM phones allow users to keep separate contact lists on each SIM, and allow easier roaming by being able to access a foreign network while keeping the existing local card.

Vendors of foreign SIMs for travel often promote dual-SIM operation, with a home country and local SIM in the same handset.

See also

 Dual mode mobile
 Subscriber Identity Module
 SIM cloning
 Shanzhai

References

Mobile phones
Mobile telecommunications